Sophie Aston (born 23 June 1970) is a British painter, noted for her landscapes.

Biography
Aston was born in East Molesey, Southwest London. She took her Foundation Diploma in 1990-91 at Wimbledon School of Art before taking her BA Hons in Fine Art at Glasgow School of Art from 1991 to 1995. She co-founded a gallery in Glasgow before studying for her MA in Fine Art from Chelsea College of Art during 1997 and 1998. Of her work at the John Moores 23 Exhibition (2004), the critic John Carey said on Newsnight Review, "It was just on the edge of realism. Extraordinarily evocative painting." Regarding her work and that of two other exhibiting painters, she said, "I would have gone to Liverpool for any one of those three." She currently teaches on the BA in Fine Art at Brighton University and at the Mary Ward Centre.

Selected exhibitions
 March 2007 “Beneath Unfamiliar Skies” Amber Roome Gallery, Edinburgh
 September 2005 “New Paintings” Studio F2 The Nunnery, London
 June 2005 The Crown and Manor Club, London, with Jake and Dinos Chapman, Cedric Christie, Peter Newman
 September 2004 John Moores 23 Exhibition of Contemporary Painting, Liverpool
 January 1995 The Hunting Art Prizes Exhibition, Royal College of Art, London

Collections
As well as many private collections, Aston's work is in the Sainsbury Centre for Visual Arts

References

1970 births
Living people
21st-century British women artists
Alumni of Chelsea College of Arts
Alumni of the Glasgow School of Art
Alumni of Wimbledon College of Arts
Artists from London
English women painters
People from Molesey
21st-century English women